HMCS Lachine was a  of the Royal Canadian Navy that served during the Second World War. Following the war a proposed transfer to the Royal Canadian Mounted Police as Starnes was cancelled, and the ship was instead sold for conversion to a salvage tug in 1945. The ship was broken up in the United Kingdom in 1955.

Design and description
However, due to the difficulty procuring diesel engines led to the small number of the diesel version being completed. The ships displaced  standard and  fully loaded. However, the size of the ship led to criticisms of their being too cramped for magnetic or acoustic minesweeping gear. This may have been due to all the additions made during the war with the installation of ASDIC, radar and depth charges.

The Bangor class came in two versions. Lachine was of the diesel-powered version, being equipped with a 9-cylinder diesel engine driving two shafts that produced . The vessels carried  of oil. The vessels had a complement of 6 officers and 77 ratings.

The Canadian diesel-powered Bangors were armed with a single quick-firing (QF) 12-pounder 12 cwt gun mounted forward. Initially the design called for a  gun, however these were replaced with 12-pounder guns. The ships were also fitted with a QF 2-pounder Mark VIII gun aft and were eventually fitted with single-mounted QF 20 mm Oerlikon guns on the bridge wings. For those ships assigned to convoy duty, they were armed with two depth charge launchers and two chutes to deploy the 40 depth charges they carried.

Service history
The minesweeper was ordered as part of the 1940–41 building programme. Her keel was laid down by Davie Shipbuilding at Lauzon, Quebec on 27 December 1940, and launched on 20 June 1942. Lachine was commissioned into the Royal Canadian Navy at Quebec City on 20 June 1942 with the pennant number J266.

Following workups, the ship was assigned to Sydney Force, a local escort force operating out of Sydney, Nova Scotia in September 1942. In October, the ship was transferred to the Western Local Escort Force. In January 1943 the Western Local Escort Force organized its escorts into groups. In June, when the force was restructured, the minesweeper joined the escort group W-6. The ship transferred to Halifax Force, a local escort force operating out of Halifax, Nova Scotia, from June 1944 until the end of the war in Europe.

On 31 July 1945, Lachine was paid off at Shelburne, Nova Scotia and laid up for disposal. Following the war the ship was intended to be transferred to the marine section of the Royal Canadian Mounted Police as Starnes, however, the transfer was cancelled. Sources disagree on what happened to the ship after that. According to Macpherson & Barrie and Miramar state the ship was instead sold for conversion to a salvage tug in 1945. The conversion was completed in 1946, the ship retaining her name and remained in service until 1955 when Lachine was broken up for scrap in 1955. However, Colledge claims the ship was converted to the tug Jacks Bay in 1952. According to Macpherson & Barrie and Miramar, this was the name that  took after her conversion.

References

Notes

Citations

Sources
 
 
 
 
 
 

 

Bangor-class minesweepers of the Royal Canadian Navy
Ships built in Quebec
1941 ships
World War II minesweepers of Canada